Reisterstown Plaza station is a Metro SubwayLink station in Baltimore, Maryland. It is located at the intersection of Patterson and Wabash Avenues, and is the fourth most northern and western station on the line, with approximately 700 parking spaces. It is within a close distance to the Reisterstown Road Plaza, for which it is named. It is also near the northwest division of the Maryland Transit Administration, where buses are stored.

One bus currently serves this station: 
82 to Monte Verde (SB)

Prior to 1987, when the Metro was extended to Owings Mills, the Reisterstown Plaza station was the final stop on the line in the northwestern direction.

In 1993, the Reisterstown Plaza station started to close early at 8 PM in order to save costs, and buses were extended to the Rogers Avenue station at the time. Within a few years, this early closure was abolished, and the station started to remain open until midnight again.

Station layout

Nearby points of interest
Baltimore City District Courthouse Wabash Division Courthouse
Social Security Administration
Reisterstown Road Plaza
American Red Cross
Food and Drug Administration District Office
NAACP

References

External links

 Wabash Avenue entrance from Google Maps Street View

Metro SubwayLink stations
Railway stations in the United States opened in 1983
Reisterstown Station, Baltimore
1983 establishments in Maryland
Railway stations in Baltimore